Hans Luber (15 October 1893 – 15 October 1940) was a German diver who competed in the 1912 Summer Olympics. He won the silver medal in the 3 metre springboard event. In the plain high diving as well as in the 10 metre platform competition he was eliminated in the first round.

References

External links

1893 births
1940 deaths
German male divers
Divers at the 1912 Summer Olympics
Olympic divers of Germany
Olympic silver medalists for Germany
Olympic medalists in diving
Medalists at the 1912 Summer Olympics
20th-century German people